Robert Christopher Austin (born 1 February 1981) is a British racing driver who formerly competed in the British Touring Car Championship. He was born in Evesham, Worcestershire.

Racing career

Formula 3
His career started in British Formula Renault in 1998, where he raced until 1999. An accident put him out of racing for the 2000 season, but he returned in British Formula 3 for Alain Menu's team in 2001, where he raced until 2004. He also has Japanese Formula Three experience (2003).

British GT Championship
Austin entered the British GT Championship in 2008 with a brand new Ginetta G50 GT4 under the Rob Austin Racing banner. He drove alongside Hunter Abbott although they missed the first event at Oulton Park when Abbott crashed and destroyed the car. They took the first of three GT4 victories in the third race of the season at Knockhill having taken delivery of a new car. The pair finished the season joint third in the GT4 standings after finishing on the podium at every race they finished, except for their disqualification at Thruxton.

British Touring Car Championship
In 2011, Austin took over the driving duties from David Pinkney in the British Touring Car Championship due to Pinkney's departure from the team after the first round. He competed in a NGTC specification Audi A4 for his own team. Austin qualified a career best fourth at Knockhill but retired in the first race. He took his maiden podium finish in the third race at Rockingham, ending up second by James Nash. He completed the season in 16th place with one podium finish and one fastest lap.

Rob Austin Racing signed Mark Hazell to drive the team's Audi A4 for the start of the 2012 season, but Austin was the only entry for the season opener at Brands Hatch Indy. He finished eighth in the first race of the season and finished fifth in the following two races. Hazell left the team after Brands Hatch, leaving Austin as the team's only driver for Donington Park and Thruxton. Austin sat out the meeting at Oulton Park while series debutant and 2009 Euroseries 3000 champion Will Bratt was the team's sole entrant at the Cheshire venue. He returned to the car for the next race at Croft, taking his second podium finish in race two. He was unable to find the budget to race at Knockhill, forcing him to miss the event but he returned to the car at Rockingham. He was disqualified from the third race at Silverstone after colliding with Daniel Welch on lap three while fighting for second place. Austin secured a title sponsor for the season finale at Brands Hatch, his car would carry a special NASCAR inspired livery for Wix Filters.

Austin confirmed his return in 2013 with the team running under the WIX Filters banner. Austin led early on in the first race of the season at Brands Hatch, he was then passed by Jason Plato and eventually finished third behind Andrew Jordan. He retired from the following two races, in race three he was collected by Dave Newsham who had spun and Austin had a high speed collision with the barriers before coming to a rest in the middle of the track. He took his first pole position in the BTCC at the Knockhill round. He took his first outright win at the next event at Rockingham; he took victory in race two ahead of Gordon Shedden. After that he only scored 11 more points for the rest of the year, finishing 11th in the standings.

Austin returned for the 2014 season. Exocet took over title sponsorship after the departure of WIX Filters. WIX then continued their BTCC tenure with Adam Morgan and his family run team 'Ciceley Racing'.

In March 2014 Hunter Abbott signed for Rob Austin Racing to run in a second Audi A4 in the 2014 season under the AlcoSense Racing Banner.

Other activities
Austin appeared in the Ron Howard film Rush (2013), portraying Brett Lunger and driving his Surtees TS19, which is owned by his father for racing in historic events.

Racing record

Career summary

Complete Formula 3 Euro Series results
(key) (Races in bold indicate pole position) (Races in italics indicate fastest lap)

Complete British GT Championship results
(key) (Races in bold indicate pole position in class) (Races in italics indicate fastest lap in class)

Complete British Touring Car Championship results
(key) (Races in bold indicate pole position – 1 point awarded in first race) (Races in italics indicate fastest lap – 1 point awarded all races) (* signifies that driver lead race for at least one lap – 1 point given)

References

External links
 Rob Austin Racing
 Rob Austin career statistics at Driver Database

1981 births
Living people
People from Evesham
English racing drivers
British Formula Renault 2.0 drivers
British Formula Three Championship drivers
British GT Championship drivers
Formula 3 Euro Series drivers
Japanese Formula 3 Championship drivers
British Touring Car Championship drivers
Sports car racing team owners
Sportspeople from Worcestershire
Ginetta GT4 Supercup drivers
Renault UK Clio Cup drivers
Carlin racing drivers